CSLU may refer to:

 The Center for Spoken Language Understanding, an Oregon Graduate Institute of Science and Technology Research Center that focuses on Spoken Language Technologies
 The CSLU Toolkit, a comprehensive suite of software tools designed to enable exploration, learning, and research into speech and human-computer interaction